"Cry" is a song by American recording artist Mandy Moore, released on November 4, 2001, by Epic Records. It was written by James Renald, and co-produced by Renald and Peter Mokran. The song was released as a single from the soundtrack A Walk to Remember: Music From the Motion Picture and was also the third and final single from her self-titled second studio album.

"Cry" has sold 15,000 physical copies and 203,000 paid digital downloads according to Nielsen Soundscan.

Song information
Moore said in a Billboard interview that she carried around a copy of the song for over a year before she recorded it. "It felt like my ace in the hole. It's such a beautiful song on every level. I couldn't wait to get into the studio and sing it." She also said that James Renald, the co-writer and co-producer of the song, had to "peel" her out of the vocal booth because she "wanted to sing it over and over again."

Commercial performance
"Cry" did not managed to enter the US Billboard Hot 100 chart or debut on charts anywhere, but it become Moore's airplay hit and most known song were it gained popularity in Asia including Philippines peaking at number one in the country radio airplay.

Track listing
CD single
 "It's Gonna Be Love" – 3:53
 "Someday We'll Know" (with Jon Foreman) – 3:42

References 

2002 singles
Mandy Moore songs
Pop ballads
2001 songs
Songs written by James Renald
Epic Records singles
2000s ballads